Saint-Gabriel-de-Rimouski is a municipality in Quebec, Canada.  Prior to January 31, 1998 it was known simply as Saint-Gabriel.

See also
 List of municipalities in Quebec

References

External links
 

Municipalities in Quebec
Incorporated places in Bas-Saint-Laurent